Jozef Špyrka (born 30 May 1999) is a Slovak professional footballer who plays as a midfielder for 2. liga club Železiarne Podbrezová.

Club career

Tatran Prešov
Špyrka made his professional Fortuna Liga debut for Tatran Prešov against ŽP Šport Podbrezová on 10 December 2016.

References

External links
 Fortuna Liga profile
 
 Futbalnet profile

1999 births
Living people
Sportspeople from Prešov
Slovak footballers
Slovakia youth international footballers
Slovakia under-21 international footballers
Association football midfielders
1. FC Tatran Prešov players
FK Pohronie players
FK Železiarne Podbrezová players
Slovak Super Liga players
2. Liga (Slovakia) players